Neopolynoe chondrocladiae is a scale worm known from the north-east Atlantic Ocean at depths of about 700 to 2500 m.

Description
Neopolynoe chondrocladiae can have up to around 94 segments with 15 pairs of elytra that bear a marginal fringe of papillae. The lateral antennae are inserted ventrally to prostomium, directly beneath the median antenna. The notochaetae are distinctly thicker than the neurochaetae and possess only simple tips.

Biology
Neopolynoe chondrocladiae has an obligate symbiotic relationship with the sponges Chondrocladia robertballardi and Chondrocladia virgata. The nature of the symbiotic relationship has been debated, but a 2021 study using a multidisciplinary approach suggested that the relationship is mutualistic, proposing that Neopolynoe chondrocladiae may use bioluminescence as a lure for prey which is consumed by both the worm and its sponge hosts.

References

Phyllodocida